Jeong Duwon (.1581), also known as Chong Tuwon, was a Korean mandarin and diplomat. His chance encounter with a generous member of the Jesuit China missions greatly expanded Korean knowledge of western science, technology, geographical knowledge, and culture centuries before it opened its borders to actual visitors from abroad.

Life
During a diplomatic mission to the Ming in Beijing in early 1631, Jeong stopped at Dengzhou (now Penglai) on the northern coast of Shandong. The normal route was overland, but the Koreans were obliged to travel directly across the Yellow Sea owing to the northern war zones created by the initial phases of the Manchu conquest of China. There, he met with the province's Christian governor under the Ming Ignatius Sun, who introduced him to the Jesuit interpreter João Rodrigues. Rodrigues was working with Gonçalo Teixeira-Correa to train Sun's forces in the use of European-style cannon. He made a personal gift of his telescope to Jeong, which became the first such device known in Korea. He also laded Jeong down with Jesuit texts on astronomy and other sciences including Alenio's Record of Foreign Lands (Chikpang Oegi); a treatise on artillery and its use; and a guide to European customs and manners, as well as works on Christianity. Despite also receiving some European firearm, Jeong praised the telescope most highly, as he understood its importance for warfare. He also had his assistants Yi Yeonghu and Colonel Jeong Hyogil speak with Rodrigues in greater detail, Yi about geography and Col. Jeong about Western firearms and cannon. A record survives of Yi's conversation. He was most curious about whether or not China—whose native name Zhōngguó literally means "The Central Realm"—did in fact occupy the middle of the earth. Rodrigues replied that, since the earth was a sphere, every country could truthfully claim their land as its center.

Legacy
Yi Sugwang had accumulated enough material from the Jesuits during his own diplomatic visits in the 1590s that he was able to compile the encyclopedic Jibong Yuseol. Another diplomat returned with a copy of Ricci's world map in 1603. Nonetheless, the additional material provided to Jeong has still been credited with the full-scale introduction of Western astronomical methods and jurisprudence to Korea. Jeong's mission is still taught to Korean schoolchildren as the country's introduction to Western science, religion, and culture.

See also
 Christianity in Korea
 Jesuit China mission

Notes

References

Citations

Bibliography
 .
 .
 .
 . 
 . 
 .
 .

17th-century Korean writers
1581 births
Year of death missing